The 1874 Wenlock by-election was fought on 12 November 1874.  The byelection was fought due to the succession to a peerage of the incumbent Conservative MP, George Weld-Forester.  It was won by the Conservative candidate Cecil Weld-Forester.

References

1874 elections in the United Kingdom
1874 in England
19th century in Shropshire
By-elections to the Parliament of the United Kingdom in Shropshire constituencies